Rhizopogon vulgaris is an ectomycorrhizal fungus used as a soil inoculant in agriculture and horticulture.

References

Rhizopogonaceae
Fungi described in 1844